Hayv Kahraman (born 1981) is an Iraqi-American-Swedish artist of Kurdish descent, who was born in Baghdad and fled to Sweden with family during the Gulf War, studied in Florence, and is currently based in Los Angeles. She is primarily a painter. Hayv Kahraman’s work explores the transformation of agency undergone by the colonial subject. Her figures are placed in seemingly impossible poses akin to circus performers or contortionists, attracting the voyeuristic gaze through an eroticisation and fetishisation of the ‘other’. Yet their faces stare plainly back at us; the gaze is tolerated. This interplay of gazes allows for the subjects to be both looked at and to look back at, subverting the coloniser’s power, and calling attention to the dehumanisation of the colonised. Kahraman’s freak show acts, like immigrants and refugees, occupy a space of both invisibility and visibility - they are relegated to certain subsections of society and ignored, while remaining naturally visible. Though her figures are vulnerable, they present themselves deliberately, showing that otherness is presented as a construct and not a given.

She was born in Iraq in 1981 to a Kurdish mother from Slemani. Her family fled to Sweden in the aftermath of the Persian Gulf War (1990-1991). Hayv lives and works in California, United States.

Life and career
Born in Baghdad, Iraq in 1981 to Kurdish parents. During the Iran War, Hayv spent a lot of her time in the basement of her uncle's house. Her relatives would all huddle around candles and play card games. While living in Iraq, she attended the Music and Ballet School in central Baghdad. One night, her family packed their car and hired a smuggler to take them to Sweden, and this is when she became a refugee. She enrolled in music and ballet classes, but decided to leave due to the teacher's racism. She studied at the Academy of Art and Design in Florence, Italy. She lives and works in California.

Works
War-aq, the Arabic word for playing cards, is a very personal group of her works. She combined the idea of a scattered deck of cards with the experiences of five million displaced Iraqis. Migrant 11 is a series of a contorted dancer that refers to the deformation of the self due to migration. This work relates to her personal experience of attending the music and ballet school in central Baghdad. Migrant 3 is a self portrait of herself cutting off her tongue to represent the loss of language and communication through her life experiences. Re-Weaving Migrant Inscriptions (2017) is a series of paintings that recalls the traditional Iraqi woven fan, or mahaffa, by cutting and weaving sections of her oil-painted self portraits, constructing a narrative of forced exile, displacement and cultural assimilation.

Not Quite Human (2019)
Not Quite Human was exhibited at the Jack Shainman Gallery in Chelsea. Several oil on linen paintings. Female figures are depicted bending their bodies into a collection of extreme positions. Kahraman’s paintings transmit strength, distress, submission and erotism all at the same time.

Exhibitions
Kahraman’s recent solo exhibitions include Gut Feelings, The Mosaic Rooms, London (2022); Touch of Otherness, SCAD Museum of Art, Savannah (2022); Not Quite Human: Second Iteration, Pilar Corrias, London (2020); Shangri La Museum of Islamic Art, Culture, and Design, Honolulu, HI (2019); De La Warr Pavilion, Sussex, UK (2019); Pomona College Museum of Art, Claremont, California (2018); and Contemporary Art Museum St, Louis, St. Louis, Missouri (2017). Other recent group exhibitions include Reflections: Contemporary Art of the Middle East and North Africa, British Museum, London (2021); Blurred Bodies, San Jose Museum of Art, San Jose (2021); New Time: Art and Feminisms in the 21st Century, Berkeley Art Museum, Berkeley (2021); Henry Art Gallery, Seattle (2019); ICA Boston (2019); and MASS MoCA, North Adams, (2019). Kahraman’s work is in several important international collections including the British Museum, London, UK; Museum of Contemporary Art, San Diego, California, US; Los Angeles County Museum of Art (LACMA), California, US; Birmingham Museum of Art, Alabama, US; The Rubell Family Collection, Florida, US; The Barjeel Art Foundation Sharjah, UAE; MATHAF: Arab Museum of Modern Art Doha, Qatar; Pizzuti Collection of Columbus Museum of Art, Ohio, US; North Carolina Museum of Art, Raleigh, US; Pérez Art Museum Miami, Miami, US.</ref>

See also
 Iraqi art
 List of Iraqi artists
 List of Iraqi women artists

References

External links
[https://hayvkahraman.com/
images of Kahraman's work from the Jack Shainman Gallery
[https://www.pilarcorrias.com/artists/hayv-kahraman/2/
images of Kahraman's work at The Third Line

1981 births
American artists
American people of Iraqi descent
Artists from Baghdad
Iraqi painters
Iraqi women artists
Living people
Umeå University alumni